The 2020 Mont Ventoux Dénivelé Challenge was the second edition of the Mont Ventoux Dénivelé Challenge road cycling one day race. It was held on 6 August as a category 1.1 event on the 2020 UCI Europe Tour.

Teams
Eighteen teams participated in the race, which consisted of six UCI WorldTeams, nine UCI ProTeams, and three UCI Continental Teams. Of these riders, 70 finished, while a further 4 riders finished over the time limit.

UCI WorldTeams

 
 
 
 
 
 

UCI ProTeams

 
 
 
 
 
 
 
 
 

UCI Continental Teams

Results

References 

2020 Mont Ventoux Dénivelé Challenge
Mont Ventoux Dénivelé Challenge
Mont Ventoux Dénivelé Challenge
Mont Ventoux Dénivelé Challenge